Staite is a surname. Notable people with the surname include: 

Jewel Staite (born 1982), Canadian actress
Neil Staite (born 1963), British rower
William Staite Murray (1881–1962), English studio potter

See also
Stait